Liverpool Garston was a borough constituency represented in the House of Commons of the Parliament of the United Kingdom.   It elected one Member of Parliament (MP) by the first past the post system of election.

Boundaries

1950–1955: The County Borough of Liverpool wards of Aigburth, Allerton, Childwall, Garston, Little Woolton, and Much Woolton.

1955–1983: The County Borough of Liverpool wards of Aigburth, Allerton, St Mary's, Speke, and Woolton.

1983–1997: The City of Liverpool wards of Allerton, Netherley, St Mary's, Speke, Valley, and Woolton.

1997–2010: The City of Liverpool wards of Allerton, Grassendale, Netherley, St Mary's, Speke, Valley, and Woolton.

The constituency was one of five covering the city of Liverpool, covering the southern part of the city.  As well as Garston, it contained areas such as Allerton, Netherley, Speke and Woolton.  Liverpool John Lennon Airport was located in the constituency.

The Liverpool Garston seat was abolished at the 2010 general election following boundary changes. It was replaced with a new Garston and Halewood constituency, also covering part of the Knowsley borough.

History
The Labour Party held Liverpool Garston from the 1983 general election until the constituency was abolished.  Prior to that time the constituency was a fairly safe Conservative seat until Labour gained it in 1974, with the Conservatives regaining it in 1979 for the last time. The Conservative share of the vote declined to less than 10% in the 2005 election, when they came third behind the Liberal Democrats.

Members of Parliament

Elections

Elections in the 1950s

Elections in the 1960s

Elections in the 1970s

Elections in the 1980s

Note:
This constituency underwent major boundary changes in 1983 and so was notionally a hold.

Elections in the 1990s

Elections in the 2000s

See also
 List of parliamentary constituencies in Merseyside

Notes and references

Constituencies of the Parliament of the United Kingdom established in 1950
Constituencies of the Parliament of the United Kingdom disestablished in 2010
Parliamentary constituencies in North West England (historic)
Garston